In the 1947–48 season, USM Blida competed in the Division Honneur for the 15th season French colonial era, as well as the Forconi Cup. They competed in Division Honneur, and the North African Cup.

Pre-season

Competitions

Overview

Division Honneur

League table

Matches

Forconi Cup

Players statistics

Playing statistics

|-
! colspan=10 style=background:#dcdcdc; text-align:center| Goalkeepers

|-
! colspan=10 style=background:#dcdcdc; text-align:center| Defenders

|-
! colspan=10 style=background:#dcdcdc; text-align:center| Midfielders

|-
! colspan=10 style=background:#dcdcdc; text-align:center| Forwards

|}

Goalscorers
Includes all competitive matches. The list is sorted alphabetically by surname when total goals are equal.

Transfers

In

Out

References

External links

USM Blida seasons
Algerian football clubs 1947–48 season